The Harvard Avenue Fire Station is a historic former fire station on 16 Harvard Avenue in Boston, Massachusetts.  The station was designed in 1891 by Harrison H. Atwood, the Boston city architect who also designed the Congress Street Fire Station,  It is a hip-roofed two story brick structure with Renaissance and Classical Revival elements.  It was the second firehouse built on the site, and housed Engine #41 and Hook and Ladder #14.

The building was listed on the National Register of Historic Places in 1983.

See also
National Register of Historic Places listings in southern Boston, Massachusetts

References

Fire stations completed in 1891
Fire stations on the National Register of Historic Places in Massachusetts
Buildings and structures in Boston
1891 establishments in Massachusetts
National Register of Historic Places in Boston
Historic district contributing properties in Massachusetts
Defunct fire stations in Massachusetts